The Sisters of Mercy are a worldwide Catholic religious order founded by Catherine McAuley.

Sisters of Mercy may refer to:

Religious orders
Sisters of Mercy of New Jersey, United States
Sisters of Mercy of St. Borromeo, France
Sisters of Mercy of Verona, Italy

Music
The Sisters of Mercy, a British Gothic rock band
"Sisters of Mercy", a song by Leonard Cohen on the album Songs of Leonard Cohen
"Sister of Mercy" (song), a 1984 song by the Thompson Twins
"Sisters of Mercy", a song by Grand Slam on the album Grand Slam: Live 1984
"Sisters of Mercy", a song by Cher on the album not.com.mercial

Film and television
Sister of Mercy (film), a 1929 French silent film
"Sisters of Mercy", the title of the 39th episode of the TV series Law & Order